Jacques Marie Gaëtan Grétillat (26 August 1885 – 19 December 1950) was a French actor and film director.

Grétillat was born in Vitry-sur-Seine (Val-de-Marne), and died in Paris.

Partial filmography

 Hamlet (1908, Short) - Hamlet
 Le traquenard (1915)
 Les soeurs ennemies (1915)
 The Corsican Brothers (1917)
 La proie (1917) - Marc de Ricardo
 Culprit (1917) - Prosper Aubry
 48, avenue de l'Opéra (1917) - Jean Daumas
 Géo, le mystérieux (1917) - Géo
 Quarante H.P. (1919) - Comte de Clain
 L'effroyable doute (1919)
 La double existence du docteur Morart (1920) - Docteur Morart
 Déchéance (1920)
 Le père Goriot (1921) - Vautrin
 Nero (1922) - Nero
 La fille des chiffonniers (1922) - Dartès
 David Golder (1931) - Marcus, Golders früherer Sozius
 Pas sur la bouche (1931) - Le mari de Gilberte
 Danton (1932) - Danton
 The Red Robe (1934) - Mouzon
 The Bread Peddler (1934) - Garaud
 La flambée (1934)
 Bourrasque (1935) - Le caïd Belkacem
 Adémaï au moyen âge (1935) - Le connétable
 L'homme du jour (1937) - M. Legal
 À minuit, le 7 (1937) - Le juge d'instruction
 L'empreinte rouge (1937) - Suriano
 Gribouille (1937) - L'avocat de la défense
 Si tu reviens (1938) - Monsieur Itier
 Gosse de riche (1938) - Gonfaron
 Café de Paris (1938) - Lambert
 The Chess Player (1938) - Potemkine
 Entente cordiale (1939) - Le député Roussel
 Les 3 tambours (1939) - Le représentant du peuple
 Face au destin (1940) - Le chargé d'affaire
 Strangers in the House (1942) - Le président des Assises
 Coup de feu dans la nuit (1943) - Monsieur du Coudrais
 Les Roquevillard (1943) - Porterieux
 Coup de tête (1944) - Le valet de pied (uncredited)
 Pamela (1945) - Le Villeheurnois
 Quai des Orfèvres (1947) - Auguste (final film role)

Bibliography
 Abel, Richard. The ciné goes to town: French cinema, 1896-1914. University of California Press, 1998
 Gallagher, Tag. John Ford: The Man and his Films. University of California Press, 1988.

External links

1885 births
1950 deaths
French male film actors
French male silent film actors
20th-century French male actors